Daniela Müller (born July 10, 1957) is a German theologian and church historian. She is a full professor in the History of Christianity and Canon Law at Radboud University, and has published extensively on the subjects of heresy and dissidents.

Biography 
Müller studied German, History and Catholic Theology in Würzburg. Subsequently, she pursued a doctorate on the ecclesiology of the Albigensians. In 1996 followed her habilitation on these subjects, with a venia legendi for history of canon law.

From 1998 onward, she was a visiting professor Canon Law at the University of Münster. She then moved to a university in the Netherlands when in 2001 she took up the chair for Church History at the Catholic University of Utrecht. In 2009, she became a professor in the history of christianity at the Faculty of Philosophy, Theology and Religious Studies at Radboud University.

Research 
Her research interests are heresy and the interweaving of canon law and theology. The point of departure of her research is the connection between historical, theological and legal aspects. 

The focus is on the interaction of the competing models of interpretation within Christianity, whereby orthodoxy and heterodoxy are not regarded as contrary, but as a continuing process of the development of learning within Christianity. The disputes concerning the different interpretations of the teachings are the driving force of the development of the spiritual culture of Europe, long before the Enlightenment.

Selected bibliography
 Frauen vor der Inquisition. Lebensform, Glaubenszeugnis und Aburteilung der deutschen und französischen Katharerinnen. (Veröffentlichungen des Instituts für Europäische Geschichte Mainz, Abt. Abendländische Religionsgeschichte, ed. Von G. MAY, Bd. 166), Mainz 1996. 
 Ketzer und Ketzerverfolgung, in: Lexikon zur Geschichte der Hexenverfolgung, eds. von G.Gersmann/K. Moeller/J.-M. Schmitt
 Schuld und Sünde, Sühne und Strafe. Strafvorstellungen der mittelalterlichen Kirche und ihre rechtlichen Konsequenzen (Schriftenreihe des Zentrums für rechtswissenschaftliche Grundlagenforschung Würzburg 1), Baden-Baden 2009. 
 Gott und seine zwei Frauen. Der Teufel bei den Katharern, In: Interdisziplinäre Hexenforschung online 3, 2011: Teuflische Beziehungen - teuflische Gestalten. Der dämonische Kontrapunkt des Hexenglaubens
 Ketzer und Kirche. Beobachtungen aus zwei Jahrtausenden (Christentum und Dissidenz 1), Münster 2014. 
 Frauen und Häresie. Europas christliches Erbe (Christentum und Dissidenz 2), Münster 2015. 
 The Making of a Cathar Counter-Church, the 'Ecclesia dei', through the Consolamentum Ritual (Baptism of the Holy Spirit), In: Bibliothèque de la Revue d'Histoire Ecclésiastique, 106, 2020, 119-161.

External links 
 Profile page at Radboud University Nijmegen
 Center for Catholic Studies
 CIRCAED

References

Living people
Academic staff of Radboud University Nijmegen
German Christian theologians
Heresy in Christianity
1957 births
20th-century German historians
21st-century German historians
20th-century German theologians
21st-century German theologians